Barbara Cox is a writer and script editor, mainly in British television, who has worked on such programmes as The Bill, The Paradise Club, Cardiac Arrest, Love Hurts, Dangerfield and Holby City.

In 1993/4 Cox collaborated with playwright Terry Johnson to create the thriller series  99-1  (Zenith Productions/ITV), which starred Leslie Grantham and Sir Robert Stephens. 99-1 did well in its first season with ratings of 12 million, but was eclipsed in its second year when the BBC scheduled The X Files against it; a projected third series was not commissioned. Cox went on to edit the more mainstream and solidly successful Wycliffe.

More recently she has also been involved in children's programmes including I Was a Rat, Bootleg and the multi-award-winning adaptation of Malorie Blackman's novel  Pig Heart Boy.

Awards
In 2005, Barbara Cox won a British Academy Children's Film and Television Award for Writer, Best Adapted Script, for the children's drama Wipe Out based on a book by Mimi Thebo.

External links
 
 BAFTA homepage

British television writers
British women television writers
Living people
Year of birth missing (living people)
Place of birth missing (living people)